Tazehabad-e Maran (also Romanized as Tāzehābād-e Marān; also known as Tāzehābād) is a village in Kani Shirin Rural District, Karaftu District, Divandarreh County, Kurdistan Province, Iran. At the 2006 census, its population was 149, in 23 families. The village is populated by Kurds.

References 

Towns and villages in Divandarreh County
Kurdish settlements in Kurdistan Province